The Bridge War may refer to a number of unrelated conflicts:

The Red River Bridge War in Oklahoma and Texas in 1931 
The Milwaukee Bridge War in 1845
The Bridge War between Cleveland and Ohio City; see The Flats
The Bridge Wars, between Boogie Down Productions and the Juice Crew